The name Philippe has been used for three tropical cyclones in the Atlantic Ocean.

Hurricane Philippe (2005), a short-lived Category 1 hurricane that stayed out in Atlantic Ocean.
Hurricane Philippe (2011), a Category 1 hurricane that never impacted any land.
Tropical Storm Philippe (2017), a short-lived and weak tropical storm which affected Cuba and South Florida.

Atlantic hurricane set index articles